Confirmation dialog (sometimes called warning alert boxes) is a dialog box that asks user to approve requested operation. Usually this dialog appears before a potentially dangerous operation is performed (program termination, file deletion, etc.)

Typically confirmation dialog boxes have two buttons (e.g. Yes / No, Confirm / Cancel) or three buttons (e. g. Save / Discard / Cancel).

Some human interface guidelines recommend avoiding unnecessary confirmation dialogs. BlackBerry and Sun Java UI guidelines recommended a confirmation button be put before a cancellation button; but a default button should not be associated with a major destructive action.

References

See also 
 Error-tolerant design
 Alert dialog box

Graphical user interface elements